LELO (LELOi AB) is a Swedish company that designs, develops and manufactures upmarket sex toys and massage products. Sold in over 50 international markets, LELO is headquartered in Stockholm, Sweden with other offices in Melbourne, San Jose, and Shanghai. LELO currently sells one of the most expensive vibrators in the world, a 24-karat gold plated vibrator that costs $15,000 USD.

History 

In 2002, industrial designers Eric Kalén and Carl Magnuson, and engineer Filip Sedic founded LELO. In September 2003, the three registered LELO LLC. Having employed just 10 people in its Stockholm headquarters in their founding year, LELO presently has over 600 employees with offices in Asia, Australia, Europe, and the US.

Operations

Design 
LELO has taken an approach to the design and manufacture of sex toys, utilizing designs that are non-representational of the sexual anatomy of the human body, a style that is now widely adopted across the sex toy industry. The company has been recognized for pioneering creations in the adult industry, including the first couples' toys with motion controller functions from their SenseMotion line, as well as the first sex toys to employ tactile sensing, the Smart Wands.

Partners and distributors

In 2016 LELO HEX condoms launched in Target stores and in 2017, they became available in all Target, Walmart and Rite Aid stores. On February 25, 2009, LELO partnered with Walgreens to make the LELO products available in all drugstore locations in the United States. Also, in 2019. LELO HEX condoms were available in Equinox Hotel. On May 22, 2010, the Swedish state-owned pharmacy chain Apoteket also announced that it would be carrying a limited range of LELO products. A month later, LELO announced its collaboration with the  Ron Robinson boutique at the Fred Segal shopping center in Hollywood. On May 13, 2011, Brookstone announced they would begin to feature the Alia, Gigi, Lily, and Siri personal massagers, and the Flickering Touch line of massage oils and candles in select retail locations, and in their online store; LELO and Brookstone launched the partnership at The Venetian, Las Vegas, where they also showcased the LELO Sussurra collection of intimate apparel.

References

External links 

 Official website

Manufacturing companies of Sweden
Sex toy manufacturers
Companies established in 2003
Companies based in Stockholm